Alagoinha (Little Alagoas) is a Brazilian municipality in the state of Pernambuco. The name "Alagoinha" refers to the many small tanks, wells, cauldrons, and lagoons within the city.
Nossa Senhora da Conceição Our Lady of Conceição is the patron saint of the city. The church of Nossa Senhora da Conceição, which has a simple style, was built by German Franciscan friars in 1916. The city has a strong connection to the  German culture.

Geography

 State - Pernambuco
 Region - Agreste of Pernambuco
 Coordinates - 
 Boundaries - Pesqueira   (north and east);  Venturosa   (south and west).
 Area - 200.42 km2
 Elevation - 726 m
 Hydrography - Ipojuca and Ipanema rivers
 Vegetation - Caatinga hiperxerófila
 Climate - Transition between tropical hot and humid and, semi arid hot and dry
 Annual average temperature - 21.6 c
 Distance to Recife - 225.5 km

Tourism
The main tourist attractions of Alagoinha are the traditional parties at Christmas and Revellon (New Year's Eve), which have been celebrated for more than 150 years. Every year, the city attracts many visitors to its fishing grounds. The surrounding mountain ranges and the numerous lagoons and waterfalls appeal to nature lovers.

Economy
The main economic activities in Alagoinha are related with tourism, commerce and agribusiness, especially the raising of cattle, goats, sheep, pigs, chickens; and the cultivation of beans, manioc and corn.

Economic indicators

Economy by Sector
2006

Health indicators

References

Municipalities in Pernambuco